Hamsilos Bay (also called Hamsalos) is a Black Sea bay in Sinop Province, the northernmost tip of Turkey.

Geography
It is situated at the west end of Akliman , a long beach which is a popular excursion spot for the Sinop citizens. The width of the bay is about  facing to east.

The fjord
Hamsilos Bay is popularly called “the only fjord of Turkey”. However in fact there are no fjords in Turkey and Hamsilos is only a cove with a peculiar shape.  On a map, it resembles an elephant head.  It is famed to be a beautiful spot where the forests meet the sea. In the past it was considered as a natural harbor for marine vessels.

Nature park
Hamsilos as well as the neighboring Akliman are declared a nature park in 2007. But there are concerns about the future of the park because of the planned Sinop Nuclear Power Plant to the south of the Hamsilos Bay.

References

Geography of Sinop Province
Nature parks in Turkey
Bays of Turkey
Black Sea Region
Tourist attractions in Sinop Province
Bays of the Black Sea